"Money in the Bank" is a song by American hip hop recording artist and record producer Swizz Beatz, released May 29, 2007 as the second single from his debut studio album One Man Band Man (2007). The song contains an interpolation to essentially a whole verse from Eric B & Rakim's song "Eric B. Is President." The song was also featured in the final dance sequence in the 2008 film Step Up 2 the Streets.

Music video
The music video, directed by Syndrome, premiered on BET's 106 & Park on August 1, 2007.
The second portion of the music video switches to a video for "Top Down", another song off Swizz Beatz's One Man Band Man album.

Remix
The official remix features guest appearances from Young Jeezy, Eve and Elephant Man.

Charts

References

2007 songs
2007 singles
Swizz Beatz songs
Motown singles
Songs written by Swizz Beatz